Sociedad Deportiva Logroñés is a Spanish football team based in Logroño, in the autonomous community of La Rioja. Founded in 2009, it plays in Primera División RFEF – Group 2. Team colours are white-and-red shirts and black shorts.

History
Sociedad Deportiva Logroñés was founded in 2009, following the serious economic problems which led to the demise of historical Riojan club CD Logroñés. June 4, 2009 is considered the day of the club's founding. 

Eventually, as Club Deportivo folded, the new team took its place in the regional leagues, starting in 2009–10. In its debut season Sociedad Deportiva finished as champions, earning promotion to Group 16 in Tercera División.

In its first season in the fourth level, the team finished the regular season in second position, being ousted in the playoffs by Gimnástica Segoviana CF. The following campaign was much more successful, as Sociedad won its group and promoted for the first time ever to Segunda División B after eliminating Peña Sport FC in Tafalla, following a 0–3 loss (but 4–3 aggregate win) on 27 May 2012. In 2014, the team returned to the fourth division and finished 3rd in the 2014-15 season there.

In February, 2019 Albert Aguilà was appointed the head coach of the club.

Season to season

2 seasons in Primera División RFEF
3 seasons in Segunda División B
8 seasons in Tercera División
1 season in Regional Preferente

Current squad
.

Reserve team

Stadium
Logroñés plays home games at Estadio Mundial 82, with a capacity of 1,500 spectators.

References

External links
Official website 
Futbolme team profile 

Association football clubs established in 2009
Fan-owned football clubs
Football clubs in La Rioja (Spain)
Sport in Logroño
2009 establishments in Spain
Primera Federación clubs